The 2000–01 OHL season was the 21st season of the Ontario Hockey League. The Guelph Storm moved from the Guelph Memorial Gardens to the Guelph Sports and Entertainment Centre at the start of the season. The Owen Sound Platers were renamed to the Owen Sound Attack Twenty teams each played 68 games. The Ottawa 67's won the J. Ross Robertson Cup, defeating the Plymouth Whalers.

Regular season

Final standings
Note: DIV = Division; GP = Games played; W = Wins; L = Losses; T = Ties; OTL = Overtime losses; GF = Goals for; GA = Goals against; PTS = Points; x = clinched playoff berth; y = clinched division title; z = clinched conference title

Eastern conference

Western conference

Scoring leaders

Playoffs

Conference quarterfinals

Eastern conference

Western conference

Conference semifinals

Conference finals

J. Ross Robertson Cup finals

J. Ross Robertson Cup Champions Roster

All-Star teams

First team
Kyle Wellwood, Centre, Belleville Bulls
Randy Rowe, Left Wing, Belleville Bulls
Branko Radivojevic, Right Wing, Belleville Bulls
Rostislav Klesla, Defence, Brampton Battalion
Alexei Semenov, Defence, Sudbury Wolves
Craig Anderson, Goaltender, Guelph Storm
Dave MacQueen, Coach, Erie Otters

Second team
Brad Boyes, Centre, Erie Otters
Raffi Torres, Left Wing, Brampton Battalion
Cory Pecker, Right Wing, Erie Otters
Kevin Dallman, Defence, Guelph Storm
Jon Zion, Defence, Ottawa 67's
Rob Zepp, Goaltender, Plymouth Whalers
Dave Cameron, Coach, Toronto St. Michael's Majors

Third team
Jason Spezza, Centre, Windsor Spitfires
Steve Ott, Left Wing, Windsor Spitfires
Nikita Alexeev, Right Wing, Erie Otters
Libor Ustrnul, Defence, Plymouth Whalers
Mark Popovic, Defence, Toronto St. Michael's Majors
Alex Auld, Goaltender, North Bay Centennials
Jim Hulton, Coach, Belleville Bulls

Awards

2001 OHL Priority Selection
On May 5, 2001, the OHL conducted the 2001 Ontario Hockey League Priority Selection. The Mississauga IceDogs held the first overall pick in the draft, and selected Patrick O'Sullivan from the USA U17 team. O'Sullivan was awarded the Jack Ferguson Award, awarded to the top pick in the draft.

Below are the players who were selected in the first round of the 2001 Ontario Hockey League Priority Selection.

See also
List of OHA Junior A standings
List of OHL seasons
2001 Memorial Cup
2001 NHL Entry Draft
2000 in sports
2001 in sports

References

HockeyDB

Ontario Hockey League seasons
OHL